Hann may refer to:

People 
 Adam Hann-Byrd (born 1982), American actor
 Allie Hann-McCurdy (born 1987), Canadian ice dancer
 Chris Hann (born 1953), British social anthropologist
 David Hann (born 1952), American politician
Della Hann, American psychologist and research administrator
 Dorothy Hann, American beauty queen
 Frank Hann (1846–1921), Australian explorer
 Georg Hann (1897–1950), Austrian operatic bass-baritone
 Jason Hann, American percussionist
 Judith Hann (born 1942), English broadcaster and writer specialising in science
 Julius von Hann (1839–1921), Austrian meteorologist
 Les Hann (1911–1988), English footballer
 Marjorie Hann (1916–2011), South Australian painter and art teacher
 Matthew Hann (born 1980), English footballer
 Ng Tian Hann (born 1969), Malaysian Chinese movie director
 Quinten Hann (born 1977), Australian snooker player
 William Hann (1837–1889), Australian explorer and cattleman
 Wong Choong Hann (born 1977), Malaysian badminton player
 Hann Trier (1915–1999), German artist

Places 
 Hann, Senegal
 Hann Land District, a region of the State of Western Australia
 Hann. Münden, a town in Lower Saxony, Germany
 Hann River, a river in the Kimberley region of Western Australia
 Han (state) (韓) state in China, called Hann to distinguish it from the homophonic Han (漢) state

Other uses 
 Hann function, a mathematical function often used as a window function
 "Hann (Alone)", a 2018 song by (G)I-dle